TM2 domain containing 1 is a protein that in humans is encoded by the TM2D1 gene.

Function

The protein encoded by this gene is a beta-amyloid peptide-binding protein. It contains a structural module related to that of the seven transmembrane domain G protein-coupled receptor superfamily and known to be important in heterotrimeric G protein activation. Beta-amyloid peptide has been established to be a causative factor in neuron death and the consequent diminution of cognitive abilities observed in Alzheimer's disease. This protein may be a target of neurotoxic beta-amyloid peptide, and may mediate cellular vulnerability to beta-amyloid peptide toxicity through a G protein-regulated program of cell death. Several transcript variants have been found for this gene.

References

Further reading